Ricki Pamela Lake (born September 21, 1968) is an American television host and actress. She is known for her lead role as Tracy Turnblad in the 1988 film Hairspray, for which she received a nomination for the Independent Spirit Award for Best Female Lead. She is also known for her talk show, Ricki Lake, which was broadcast internationally from September 1993 until May 2004. When the show debuted, Lake was 24 and credited as being the youngest person to host a syndicated talk show at the time. In late 2012, Lake began hosting a second syndicated talk show, The Ricki Lake Show. The series was canceled in 2013 after a single season, but Lake won her first Daytime Emmy Award for the project.

Early life 
Lake was born in Hastings-on-Hudson, New York, to a secular Jewish family. Her parents are Jill (a homemaker) and Barry Lake (a pharmacist), though Lake was largely brought up by her paternal grandmother, Sylvia Lake, until Sylvia's death in 1978.

Lake attended Ithaca College for one year.

Career

Acting 

Lake made her film debut as Tracy Turnblad, the lead character in John Waters's 1988 cult classic Hairspray. Lake also starred in other Waters films including Cry-Baby (with Johnny Depp and Susan Tyrrell), Cecil B. Demented (with Melanie Griffith and Stephen Dorff), and Serial Mom (with Kathleen Turner and Sam Waterston). She starred in Mrs. Winterbourne with Shirley MacLaine and Brendan Fraser, Cabin Boy, Last Exit to Brooklyn, Cookie, and Inside Monkey Zetterland.

She joined the cast of the Vietnam War drama series China Beach as a Red Cross volunteer, Holly "the Donut Dolly" Pelegrino, for the show's third season. She also had a recurring role on the CBS sitcom The King of Queens as Doug's sister Stephanie. She guest-starred on television series including Drop Dead Diva and a voice role on King of the Hill, and starred in the television movie Baby Cakes. She had a cameo appearance in the 2007 remake of the original cult-classic Hairspray as a William Morris talent agent, and teamed up with star Nikki Blonsky (who played Tracy Turnblad in the 2007 movie musical remake) and Marissa Jaret Winokur (who played Tracy Turnblad in the Broadway musical based on the original 1988 film) to record "Mama I'm a Big Girl Now" for the soundtrack. The song is played during the film's end credits. She later reunited with original Hairspray co-star Deborah Harry for the film Hotel Gramercy Park, which was released in 2008.

Talk shows 

Ricki Lake was Lake's first daytime talk show and at 24, she was the youngest person at the time to host one. The show specialized in topics involving invited guests and incorporated questions and comments from a studio audience.

The show debuted in syndication on September 13, 1993, and ended first-run episodes on May 25, 2004. In 2000, Lake told Rosie O'Donnell in an interview that she had signed on for four additional years. Although Sony Pictures Television had many stations contracted through the 2004–2005 season, Lake decided to end the show in August 2004, citing (among other things) a desire to spend time with her family. She moved from Los Angeles to New York to tape the 11th season of the show, then returned to California when taping was complete. Lake returned to the talk show platform when she hosted a revived version of her original talk show which premiered in September 2012 and was cancelled after one season.

2006–2010: Other projects 

After her talk show had wrapped production on its final season, Lake went on to host the 2006 CBS limited series Gameshow Marathon, which re-created classic game shows with celebrity contestants. She also signed a development deal with Gameshow Marathon production company FremantleMedia for other ventures, including creating and producing future programs and projects. In October 2007, Lake appeared in the Lifetime TV movie Matters of Life and Dating. Lake also had a cameo in the 2007 film Hairspray as a talent agent and also sang "Mama I'm A Big Girl Now" with Nikki Blonsky and Marissa Jaret Winokur for the film's end credits. The Business of Being Born, Lake's documentary about home birth and midwifery, was released in limited markets on January 18, 2008. The film premiered at the Tribeca Film Festival and Red Envelope released the film in New York, L.A. and San Francisco in October; it also screened in Australia.

The Business of Being Born included footage and details of Lake's own "life-changing" home-birthing experience and followed a midwife going about her work. Tribeca called it "The Inconvenient Truth of Childbirth". Lake described it as her life's work for the last three years and expressed hopes that the film educated and empowered people to really know their choices in childbirth. She performed in the CBS television special Loving Leah in January of that year. Lake also jointly wrote a book on the world of natural childbirth and birthing options, along with Abby Epstein and Jacques Moritz, Your Best Birth, which was published by Wellness Central on May 1, 2009. Lake and Epstein also launched MyBestBirth.com, an online social network, powered by Ning, intended to allow parents and medical professionals to dialogue about varying birthing options and resources. Lake returned to television on May 11, 2009, succeeding Sharon Osbourne as host for the third season of VH1's Charm School. On November 10, 2010, Lake joined fellow talkers Phil Donahue, Sally Jessy Raphael, Geraldo Rivera, and Montel Williams as guests of Oprah Winfrey on The Oprah Winfrey Show, marking the first time those hosts appeared together on one show since their respective programs left the air.

2011–present 
In March 2011, reports said that three television studios, Twentieth Television, Universal Media Studios and CBS Television Distribution, were interested in bringing Lake back to the talk-show realm in 2012. This after Lake began appearing on various programs in which she expressed a desire to return to the genre. Lake competed on the 13th season of Dancing with the Stars. She was partnered with three-time champion Derek Hough and cited Kirstie Alley's appearance as an inspiration to do the show. Lake achieved tremendous success, consistently achieving high scores. After making the finals, Lake was announced as the contestant in third place, losing to television personality Rob Kardashian and actor and Army veteran J. R. Martinez, despite having higher scores than either.

On April 20, 2011, Lake signed with Twentieth Television to develop The Ricki Lake Show, which premiered in September 2012. The new program had a more Oprah-like format as compared to her earlier talk show. It was cancelled after one season. Lake won the Daytime Emmy for Outstanding Talk Show Host in 2013.

On December 7, 2016, Lake made a cameo in the television musical Hairspray Live! On February 11, 2017, Lake appeared as a guest judge on the British talent show Let It Shine with Gary Barlow, Dannii Minogue, and Martin Kemp on the BBC. On February 17, 2018, Lake appeared on the British television show Through the Keyhole hosted by Keith Lemon.

In March 2018, at SXSW, Lake and Epstein premiered their documentary film Weed the People, examining the use of cannabis as medicine and its status as a Schedule I prohibited drug in the United States. The film focused in particular on the use of cannabis in the treatment of pediatric cancer.

On February 6, 2019, she was revealed to be "Raven" in the Fox series The Masked Singer. She performed "Rainbow" by Kesha, "Bad Romance" by Lady Gaga and "Brave" by Sara Bareilles. In October 2019, she began competing in The X Factor: Celebrity.

On October 28, Ricki made a guest appearance on the ITV Daytime program Loose Women. Ricki was said to be a last minute addition to the panel with one of the original panellist off sick at short notice.

Dancing with the Stars performances

Personal life 
Lake has discussed drastic weight changes in interviews, including swings of up to 100 pounds and extreme diets that left her "fainting on, like, the spot. I'd be standing up and then, black out, and not remember anything."

Lake met illustrator Rob Sussman in October 1993, on Halloween. The couple married in Las Vegas on March 26, 1994. They have two sons: Milo Sebastian Sussman, and Owen Tyler Sussman, whose actual water birth was shown in The Business of Being Born, which Lake also produced. The couple filed for divorce in August 2003; it was finalized on February 25, 2004.

Lake began dating jewelry designer Christian Evans in mid-2009. They became engaged in August 2011, and married on April 8, 2012. On October 29, 2014, Lake filed for divorce from Evans, citing "irreconcilable differences". In December 2014, however, they announced they had put their divorce on hold; it was finalized in 2015. Christian Evans died by suicide on February 11, 2017.

On September 18, 2010, Lake's rented Malibu home was destroyed by a fire. She and her sons escaped without injury.

On January 15, 2011, Lake finished in sixth place in the PokerStars Caribbean Adventure Luxury Ladies Poker Event, collecting $5,587 of the prize pool.

On January 1, 2020, Lake posted a picture on her social media accounts, in which she revealed that she had been dealing with hair loss that had resulted from years of depression, weight loss, pregnancy and the use of chemicals in her hair dating back to her work in Hairspray (Lake confirmed that it was her actual hair that was used during the filming: "I went from Hairspray to 'Hairless'"), which caused her to finally cut her receding hair and then reveal her new buzz-cut (she also noted that her first talk show, in which they did outrageous hairstyle episodes, was another factor in her decision). Lake said the struggle had been "debilitating, embarrassing, painful, scary, depressing, lonely", noting that "there have been a few times where I have even felt suicidal over it. Almost no one in my life knew the level of deep pain and trauma I was experiencing". Lake assured everyone that she had not been diagnosed with other medical conditions related to the hair loss, and wanted to embrace her new look, saying that "I am liberated. I am free. I am releasing and letting go. I am brave. I am beautiful. I am love".

In February 2021 she announced that she was engaged to Ross Burningham. They married in January 2022.

Filmography

Film

Television

In popular culture
Lake is mentioned by name in the following songs:

 "The Neden Game" by Insane Clown Posse (1997)
 "Who Would've Thought" by Rancid (1998)
 "Pretty Fly (For a White Guy)" by The Offspring (1998)
 "Strong" by Robbie Williams (1998)
 "Lovesick" by TLC (1999)
 "Chopsticks" by Groovenics (2001)
 "Hole in the Head" by Sugababes (2003)
 "Till the World Ends (Femme Fatale Remix)" by Britney Spears featuring Nicki Minaj and Kesha (2011)
 "How That Taste" by Kehlani (2015)
 "#itsEazy" by Eazy Mac (2017)
 "Money Good" by Megan Thee Stallion (2019)
 "Shoulderblades" by Girl Band (2019)
 "Ricki Lake" by Netta (2020)
 Ricki Lake is mentioned in an episode of American Dad! during the song "Breakin" that Roger and Stan evolve into during their struggle to see which one is the better actor in S6E11 A Piñata Named Desire.

References

External links

 
 

1968 births
Jewish American actresses
American cannabis activists
Actresses from New York (state)
American film actresses
Film producers from New York (state)
American game show hosts
American television actresses
Television producers from New York (state)
American women television producers
American television talk show hosts
Ithaca College alumni
Living people
Daytime Emmy Award for Outstanding Talk Show Host winners
Participants in American reality television series
People from Hastings-on-Hudson, New York
20th-century American actresses
21st-century American actresses
American women film producers
21st-century American Jews